Inconnu can mean:

 Inconnu, Stenodus nelma, a freshwater whitefish in the family Salmonidae

Arts
Inconnu Independent Art Group, an art group
Inconnu (World of Darkness), a fictional vampire sect
L'Inconnue de la Seine, a death mask that was perceived as an icon of female beauty in the early 20th century
Les Inconnus, three French humorists: Didier Bourdon, Bernard Campan and Pascal Légitimus
Bel Inconnu, an Arthurian character

See also
 Inconnue River (disambiguation)